Bhila  is a village in Barnala district of Punjab State, India.  The village is administrated by a Sarpanch who is an elected representative.

Demography 
According to the report published by Census India in 2011, Bhila has a total number of 136 houses and population of 686 of which include 364 males and 322 females. Literacy rate of Bhila is  73.37%, lower than state average of 75.84%.  The population of children under the age of 6 years is 89 which is  12.97% of total population of Bhila, and child sex ratio is approximately  894, higher than state average of 846.

Air travel connectivity 
The closest airport to the village is Sri Guru Ram Dass Jee International Airport.

Villages in Kapurthala

External links
  Villages in Kapurthala
 Kapurthala Villages List

References

Villages in Kapurthala district